Disclaimer is the seventeenth studio album by King Creosote, released in 2001.

Track listing
Carrion Place      
Waltz Off With The Watch      
Only Been Gone One Day       
To Look Like Yachts       
My Books       
6-7-8     
Why Don't We Go Dancing Anymore?       
I'm Up A Plum Tree       
And I Mean 'S'      
Gender Specific Toys      
Hitch Hiker's Guide To The Yokey       
In Need Of A Smile       
Alias Etcetera       
John Taylor Starts His Month Away    
Where's Gordon?       
Bal-a-leery     
Pos Pos Pat      
Bum Chord

2001 albums
King Creosote albums